Mohammad Nurul Islam ( – 22 December 2007) was a Bangladeshi economist who served as the third Governor of Bangladesh Bank, country's central bank, from 1976 to 1987.

References

Bangladeshi economists
Governors of Bangladesh Bank

1920s births

2007 deaths
Burials at Banani Graveyard
Year of birth uncertain
Place of birth missing